"Jésus Christ" is a song by French singer Johnny Hallyday. It was released in 1970.

Commercial performance 
The song spent 11 weeks at no. 1 on the singles sales chart in France (from 2 to 26 August and from 26 September to 4 October 1966).

Charts

References 

1970 songs
1970 singles
Johnny Hallyday songs
French songs
Songs about Jesus
Philips Records singles
Number-one singles in France
Song articles with missing songwriters